Maya Iosifovna Turovskaya (27 October 1924 – 4 March 2019) was a Soviet and Russian theatrical and film critic, film historian, screenwriter, and culturologist.

She was awarded the Nika Award in 2007 for her contribution to cinematographic sciences and criticism.

Biography
Maya Turovskaya was born in Kharkov. In 1947 she graduated from the philological faculty of Moscow State University, and in 1948 – the theater department of GITIS, where she was a student of Abram Efros. She became a member of the Union of Soviet Writers in 1960, and a member of the USSR Union of Cinematographers in 1966.

In 1969, it was the first time since 1949 that it was recruited by a research associate at the Institute of World Economy and International Relations. From 1973 to 2019, she worked as a leading researcher at the Institute of Theory, History of Cinema.

She has been published in Theater, Soviet Screen, The Art of Cinema,  Kinovedcheskie Zapiski,  Moscow Observer and other publications. The author of the retrospective of the Cinema of the Totalitarian Epoch  at the International Film Festival in Moscow in 1989. She authored a number of documentaries, including Mikhail Romm's famous film Triumph Over Violence (co-authored with Romm and Khanyutin), and numerous monographs devoted to theater and cinema. She completed her doctorate in Art History in 1983.

From 1992 until her death in 2019 at age 94 she lived in Munich. She died on 4 March 2019.

References

External links 
 
 Майя Туровская на сайте журнала «Сеанс»
  Майя Туровская: Россия любит силу, это компенсация всех унижений

1924 births
2019 deaths
Writers from Kharkiv
Soviet screenwriters
20th-century Russian screenwriters
Russian film critics
Russian women critics
Women screenwriters
Moscow State University alumni
Russian Academy of Theatre Arts alumni
Recipients of the Nika Award
Russian expatriates in Germany